Where Angels Go, Trouble Follows is a 1968 American comedy film directed by James Neilson and starring Rosalind Russell, Stella Stevens and Binnie Barnes. Written by Blanche Hanalis, the film is based on a story by Jane Trahey about an old-line mother superior who is challenged by a modern young nun when they take the girls of St. Francis Academy on a bus trip across the United States.

The film is a sequel to The Trouble with Angels (1966). Russell, Barnes, Mary Wickes and Dolores Sutton all reprise their roles as nuns from the original film.

Plot
The conservative Mother Superior and the glamorous, progressive young Sister George shepherd a busload of Catholic high-school girls across the country to an interfaith youth rally in Santa Barbara, California. As they debate expressions of faith and the role of the church during the tumultuous times, they must also contend with the antics of two rebellious, troublemaking students, Rosabelle and Marvel Anne.

During their journey, their school bus blunders onto the set of an outdoor Western movie, anachronistically ruining an important scene
and reducing the director (Milton Berle) to apoplexy. Luckily, benevolent millionaire Mr. Farraday (Robert Taylor) happens along and smooths things over by paying for the damages.

Cast
 Rosalind Russell as Mother Superior
 Stella Stevens as Sister George
 Milton Berle as Film Director
 Arthur Godfrey as The Bishop
 Van Johnson as Father Chase
 Robert Taylor as Mr. Farraday
 Binnie Barnes as Sister Celestine
 Mary Wickes as Sister Clarissa
 Dolores Sutton as Sister Rose-Marie
 Susan Saint James as Rosabelle
 Barbara Hunter as Marvel Anne
 Alice Rawlings as Patty
 Hilary Thompson as Hilarie
 Devon Douglas as Devon
 Ellen Moss as Tanya
 Cherie Lamour as Cherie
 June Fairchild as June

Production

Development
The film was announced in May 1967.

Casting
Along with Russell, the three featured nuns from The Trouble with Angels (Mary Wickes as Sister Clarissa, Binnie Barnes as Sister Celestine and Dolores Sutton as Sister Rose-Marie) returned for the sequel. Barbara Hunter also reprised her role as Marvel Anne, the cousin of Mary Clancy, Hayley Mills' character. The role of Sister George was originally written for Sister Mary Clancy, but after Mills declined to appear in the film, the part was rewritten. Susan Oliver and Connie Stevens were also considered for the role of Sister George.

Filming locations
Principal photography began on July 17, 1967 in Philadelphia, where many scenes in the first half of the movie were filmed, including Market Street near 13th Street and City Hall, and a protest scene at the Philadelphia Museum of Art. Other scenes were filmed in the Lehigh Valley at Dorney Park & Wildwater Kingdom and at St. Mary's Villa, a Catholic home for troubled youths on Bethlehem Pike in Ambler, Pennsylvania.

A scene prominently displays Dorney Park, an amusement park in Allentown, Pennsylvania.

The early bus scenes were filmed in nearby Fort Washington, Pennsylvania and along the Pennsylvania Turnpike.

Soundtrack
The theme song was written and performed by singer-songwriter duo Boyce and Hart. Composer Lalo Schifrin, best known for his work on the television series Mission: Impossible, collaborated with Boyce and Hart on the title song and supplied the incidental score.
 "Where Angels Go, Trouble Follows" (Schifrin, Boyce, and Hart) performed by Tommy Boyce and Bobby Hart – 1:59
 "Goodbye Baby (I Don't Want to See You Cry)" (Schifrin, Boyce, and Hart) performed by Tommy Boyce and Bobby Hart – 2:57

Reception
In a contemporary review for The New York Times, critic Vincent Canby called the film a "cute-as-a-button comedy" and wrote: "Considering the apparent success of the original film, to say nothing of the immense popularity of other fantasies about nuns who fly and sing, there is probably a large audience waiting to be gulled into somnambulistic complacency by these new slapsticky and sentimental antics. ... [T]he film must rely on the inventiveness of its comic situations and on the appeal of its players. The comedy, however, is strictly up-dated 'Junior Miss,' and the performances right out of Hollywood stock ..."

See also
 List of American films of 1968

References

External links
 
 
 
 

1968 films
1968 comedy films
American comedy films
American road movies
American sequel films
Columbia Pictures films
Films scored by Lalo Schifrin
Films about Catholic nuns
Films about religion
Films about Catholicism
Films directed by James Neilson
Films shot in Allentown, Pennsylvania
Films shot in New Mexico
Films shot in Philadelphia
Nuns in fiction
1960s English-language films
1960s American films